is a Japanese glass manufacturing company. In 2006, it acquired Pilkington of the United Kingdom. This makes NSG/Pilkington one of the four largest glass companies in the world alongside another Japanese company Asahi Glass, Saint-Gobain, and Guardian Industries.

The company is listed on the Tokyo Stock Exchange and is a constituent of the Nikkei 225 stock index.

History
The company was established in November 1918 as America Japan Sheet Glass Co., Ltd. with its head office in Osaka, after it obtained technology from Libbey Owens Ford Glass Co. of the United States to produce flat glass using the Colburn process. The company changed its name to the Nippon Sheet Glass Co., Ltd. in January 1931. It expanded operations across Japan post World War II, and in October 1970, acquired Nippon Safety Glass Co., Ltd. In April 1999, the company merged with Nippon Glass Fiber Co., Ltd. and Micro Optics Co., Ltd. In April 2001, the company acquired Nippon Muki Co., Ltd. and in July 2004, moved the registered head office from Osaka to Minato Ward in Tokyo.

Pilkington
In 1986, Pilkington bought Libbey Owens Ford. Following an agreed acquisition of 20% of Pilkington of the United Kingdom in 2001, in 2006, NSG purchased the residual 80% of shares.

Present
Founded in 1918, NSG acquired the leading UK-based glass manufacturer Pilkington plc in June 2006. Today, the company has combined sales of approximately JPY 600 billion, with manufacturing operations in 29 countries and sales in 130 countries, employing some 28,500 people worldwide.

The Group's Flat Glass businesses, encompassing Building Products and Automotive Products, account for 90 per cent of annual sales, with the balance being in Specialty Glass. The Specialty Glass business covers a number of niche markets, the most important of which are in displays and optical products for printers and copiers.

Geographically, 42 per cent of the Group's sales are in Europe, 28 per cent in Japan and 13 per cent in North America, with the rest primarily in South America, Southeast Asia and China.

Main products in Japan

NSG TEC solar energy products, technical glass for white goods and displays

Home use 
 SPACIA: Double glazing with vacuum layer at center plane. (Eco-Glass)
 SECUO: Security glass as laminated glass with resin sheet.
 PAIR REIBORG: Double glazing, sunshading and high-thermal insulating glass with special metal coating. (Eco-Glass)
 PAIR REIBORG HIKARI: Photocatalytic cleaning glass with REIBORG. (Eco-Glass)
 HOME TOUGH LIGHT: Toughened glass with 5 times toughness as normal glass.

Building use 
 UMU: Electric controlled switching glass with transparent or photo scattered.

Telecom・IT use 
 SELFOC: Flat-end-type Rod lens with graded index by ion exchange (self focus)
 SLA SELFOC LENS ARRAY: Arrayed Selfoc lens for scanning image like a copy-machine or printer.

Automobile use 
 LAMIPANE: Laminated glass for windshield.
 THERLITE-T: Heater line installed Anti-fogging glass.

References

External links
 NSG Corporate Website 
 NSG Commercial Website 
 GO FOTON! (formerly NSG America, Inc.)

Glassmaking companies of Japan
Glass trademarks and brands
Manufacturing companies based in Tokyo
Mitsui
Companies listed on the Tokyo Stock Exchange
Japanese brands
Sumitomo Group
Manufacturing companies established in 1918
Japanese companies established in 1918